Black'n'Roll is the second studio album by the Polish metal band Black River. It was released via Mystic Production on 21 September 2009.

Videos were made to the songs "Black'n'Roll" and "Lucky in Hell", starring actress Magdalena Cielecka, both directed by Roman Przylipiak.

Drum parts were recorded on DW kit owned by Piotr Kozieradzki from progressive rock band Riverside. Some choir parts were made by members of Black River official message board.

Track listing 
 "Barf Bag" – 3:46
 "Isabel" – 3:24
 "Lucky in Hell" – 4:46
 "Black'n'Roll" – 2:05
 "Breaking the Wall" – 3:48
 "Jumping Quenny Flash" – 3:25
 "Too Far Away" – 3:53
 "Loaded Weapon" – 3:40
 "Morphine" – 4:50
 "Like a Bitch" – 3:22
 "Young'n'Drunk" – 4:16

Personnel 
 Maciej Taff – lead vocals, lyrics
 Tomasz "Orion" Wróblewski – bass, backing vocals
 Dariusz "Daray" Brzozowski – drums, backing vocals
 Piotr "Kay" Wtulich – guitar, backing vocals
 Artur "Art." Kempa – guitar, backing vocals
 Arkadiusz Malczewski – sound engineering
 Andrzej Karp – sound engineering
 Roman Przylipiak – cover art, layout
 Tomasz Zalewski – mix
 Jacek Gawłowski – mastering

Charts

References 

2009 albums
Mystic Production albums